The first series of Waterloo Road, a British television school drama series, created by Ann McManus and Maureen Chadwick and produced by BBC Scotland and Shed Productions, commenced airing in the United Kingdom on 9 March 2006 and concluded after 8 episodes on 27 April 2006. 

Waterloo Road's first series aired in the United Kingdom on Thursdays at 8:00 pm GMT on BBC One, a terrestrial television network, where it received an average of 4.54 million viewers per episode.

Premise 
The show follows the lives of the teachers and the pupils at the eponymous school of Waterloo Road, a failing inner-city comprehensive, tackling a wide range of issues often seen as taboo such as drink driving, underage driving, bullying, homosexuality, marital problems, exclusion, Huntington's disease, teenage pregnancy, abortion, bereavement, sexual harassment, mental illness and suicide.

Plot 
The first series focused on the new Head Teacher Jack Rimmer's attempts to keep the school of Waterloo Road open, following the school being threatened with closure by the LEA, owing to falling pupil numbers, bad behaviour and the bad publicity the school had been receiving following the previous Head Teacher's mental breakdown. In order to improve things around the school, Jack Rimmer employs enthusiastic Andrew Treneman as Deputy Head. However, Andrew struggles to connect with both the staff and the pupils at first, having come from a more successful upper class school and background. 

One of the major plots this series focused on the death of student Adam Deardon, who dies in a car crash. Classmate Donte Charles was driving the car when it happened, both underage and under the influence of alcohol. Another central character in the first series is Lewis Seddon, who bullies fellow student Rory Bears for being homosexual and who does not behave well in class. His out of control behaviour culminates in him sexually harassing Pastoral Care teacher Kim Campbell. 

The first series also explored the break-up of English teachers Tom Clarkson and Lorna Dickey's short-lived marriage, due to Tom's love for the school's Drama teacher and Lorna's best friend, Izzie Redpath. The series ends with Lorna taking a step towards the edge of a canal in an attempt to end her own life.

Cast

Staff
 Jason Merrells as Jack Rimmer; Headteacher (8 episodes)
 Jamie Glover as Andrew Treneman; Deputy Headteacher and English teacher (8 episodes)
 Angela Griffin as Kim Campbell; Head of Pastoral Care and Art teacher (8 episodes)
 Jason Done as Tom Clarkson; English teacher (8 episodes)
 Camilla Power as Lorna Dickey; English teacher (8 episodes)
 Jill Halfpenny as Izzie Redpath; Head of Drama and English teacher (8 episodes)
 Denise Welch as Steph Haydock;  Head of French (8 episodes)
 Philip Martin Brown as Grantly Budgen;  Head of English (8 episodes)
 Judith Barker as Estelle Cooper; School secretary (8 episodes)

Pupils
 Adam Thomas as Donte Charles (8 episodes)
 Katie Griffiths as Chlo Grainger (8 episodes)
 Lauren Drummond as Mika Grainger (7 episodes)
 Chelsee Healey as Janeece Bryant (7 episodes)
 Craig Fitzpatrick as Lewis Seddon (6 episodes)
 Rhea Bailey as Yasmin Deardon (4 episodes)
 Daisy Wignall as Holly Tattersall (4 episodes)

Others

Recurring
 Steve Money as Clarence Charles; Donte's father (6 episodes)
 David Crellin as Jimmy Grainger; Izzie's ex-husband and Chlo and Mika's father (4 episodes)
 Anna Wilson-Jones as Heather Davenport; LEA inspector (3 episodes)
 Josh Hanlon as Rory Brears; Pupil (2 episodes)
 Shane Zaza as Ahmed Patel; Pupil (2 episodes)

Guest
 Robert Angell as Nigel Hinchcliffe; Chair of Governors (1 episode)
 Sherry Baines as Brenda Brears; Rory's mother (1 episode)
 Claire Cooper as Zoe Ramsden; Pupil (1 episode)
 Scott Kay as Zak Walker; Pupil (1 episode)
 Kris Mochrie as Craig Harris; Father of Zoe's baby (1 episode)
 Jordan Murphy as Hadleigh Flynn; Pupil (1 episode)
 Marc Silcock as Anthony Sugden; Pupil (1 episode)

Production
Waterloo Road was commissioned by Shed Productions alongside BBC Scotland for a run of 8 sixty-minute episodes. The series was set in Rochdale, England, with filming based in the same location and starting from the autumn of 2005. Regularly, music was taken from bands Kaiser Chiefs, Gorillaz, The Killers and Oasis during the first series. Due to copyright issues, some music is unavailable on the DVD release in all regions.

Episodes

DVD release
The first series of Waterloo Road was released on DVD in the UK on 26 March 2007, published by 2entertain. The release includes all eight episodes on a three-disc set and does not include any special features, unlike later series. It was released with a "12" British Board of Film Classification (BBFC) certificate (meaning it is unsuitable for viewing by those under the age of 12 years). Later, in Australia, the box set was released on 7 October 2010, and in the US and Canada on 16 October 2012.

Footnotes

References

2006 British television seasons
Waterloo Road (TV series)